Saudi Arabia first competed at the Deaflympics for the first time in 2001. Saudi Arabia won its first Deaflympic medal (bronze) in the 2009 Summer Deaflympics for bowling, which is also the only medal won by them in Deaflympic history.

Saudi Arabia has yet to compete at the Winter Deaflympics.

Medal tallies

Summer Deaflympics

See also 
 Saudi Arabia at the Olympics
 Saudi Arabia at the Paralympics

References 

Nations at the Deaflympics
D
Parasports in Saudi Arabia
Deaf culture in Saudi Arabia